Sital (also Romanized as Sītal) is a village in Negur Rural District, Dashtiari District, Chabahar County, Sistan and Baluchestan Province, Iran. At the 2006 census, its population was 366, in 68 families.

References 

Populated places in Chabahar County